The GHI Bronx Tennis Classic 1993 has been a tennis tournament within the ATP Challenger Series, taking place during the ATP Challenger Series 1993. The tournament was played in Bronx, in the United States from the 16th to the 22nd of August 1993, on concrete.

Singles main-draw entrants

Seeds

Other entrants

Champions

Singles

 Jean-Philippe Fleurian def.  Chris Wilkinson, 3–6, 7–5, 6-2

Doubles

 Johan de Beer /  Kevin Ullyett def.   Wayne Arthurs /  Grant Doyle , 7–6, 7-6

External links 
 Scores

GHI Bronx Tennis Classic
GHI Bronx Tennis Classic
1990s in the Bronx
GHI Bronx Tennis Classic
Sports competitions in New York City
Sports in the Bronx
Tennis tournaments in New York City